Melanoides pupiformis is a species of freshwater snail, gastropod in the Thiaridae family. It is endemic to Lake Malawi. Its natural habitat is freshwater lakes. It is threatened by habitat loss.

The IUCN Red List of Threatened Species treats the species as a synonym of Melanoides polymorpha.

References

Fauna of Lake Malawi
Invertebrates of Malawi
Invertebrates of Mozambique
Invertebrates of Tanzania
Freshwater snails of Africa
Thiaridae
Taxa named by Edgar Albert Smith
Gastropods described in 1877
Taxonomy articles created by Polbot
Taxobox binomials not recognized by IUCN